Cedar rust may refer to:

Gymnosporangium juniperi-virginianae, or Cedar-apple rust
Gymnosporangium clavipes, or Cedar-quince rust
Gymnosporangium globosum, or Cedar-hawthorn rust

See also
Miller v. Schoene